The word "dobradinha" (from the Portuguese word "dobro" which means double) is also used in Portugal for the achievement known as double in association football.

Dobrada (in Portugal) or dobradinha (in Brazil) is a traditional Portuguese and Brazilian dish made from a cow's flat white stomach lining commonly flavoured with paprika, tomato paste, onion, garlic, clove and red pepper paste.  Usually, decorated with green onion and mint. The adding of sliced carrots and butter beans are essential as well. White rice is often served alongside this dish, especially in the city of Porto where it is called tripas à moda do Porto.

Origin

The dish originated in Porto, in northern Portugal, where it is called dobrada or tripas—people from Porto are nicknamed tripeiros. It has been a traditional Portuguese dish since the 15th century, and became also traditional in Brazil.

In popular culture
It was the theme of Fernando Pessoa's poem "Dobrada à moda do Porto".

The joke website of the UK Tripe Marketing Board featured the dish on its series of 2014 World Cup recipe cards.

See also

 List of Portuguese dishes
 Tripas
 Tripas à moda do Porto

References

Portuguese cuisine